Muxax (also, Muchach and Mukhakh) is a village and municipality in the Zaqatala Rayon of Azerbaijan. It has a population of 7,236.

References 

Populated places in Zaqatala District